A number of ships of the French Navy have borne the name Guerrière (female form of "warrior").

Ships named Guerrière 
  (1689), a Duchesse-class ordinary galley.
 , a 44-gun frigate.
 , a 58-gun razeed frigate, formerly the 74-gun .
 , a sail and steam frigate.

See also

Notes and references

Notes

References

Bibliography 
 
 

French Navy ship names